Gemas is a state constituency in Negeri Sembilan, Malaysia, that has been represented in the Negeri Sembilan State Legislative Assembly.

History

Polling districts
According to the gazette issued on 24 March 2018, the Gemas constituency has a total of 7 polling districts.

Representation history

References

Negeri Sembilan state constituencies